Jones–Jarvis House, also known as General Foster's Headquarters and Jarvis–Slover House, is a historic home located at New Bern, Craven County, North Carolina.  It was built about 1810, and is a -story, three bay, side-hall plan, Federal style brick dwelling.  It has a one-story brick and frame rear wing.  During the American Civil War, General John G. Foster moved into this house, and it served first as his residence and later as part of the headquarters of the Eighteenth Army Corps.

It was listed on the National Register of Historic Places in 1973.

Architecture

The Jones–Jarvis House is one of New Bern's outstanding examples of federal architecture. The lot was purchased by Frederick Jones in 1810 for $1,575 and later sold to Moses Jarvis. It was occupied and listed on tax records in 1816.  The National Register of Historic Places describes it as:

"one of a small number of brick Federal houses in New Bern, all built on a side-hall plan, and all similar. Either because of site, or finish, or the occupations of their owners, however, each possesses a distinct architectural and historical character. This house, with its lots fronting on the Neuse River, is part of a group of nineteenth century brick houses at the corner of Union and East Front streets which is one of the finest architectural complexes in the state."

The Eli Smallwood House next door and the Jones-Jarvis house are nearly identical. Across the street is the Slover–Bradham House. It was the Union Army General Burnside's headquarters, whose "distinctive style of facial hair became known as sideburns, derived from his last name." The house later became that of Caleb Bradham, a pharmacist who invented Pepsi-Cola in 1898.

Timeline
 1810 Lot purchased by Frederic Jones for $1,575
 1811 Purchased by Moses Jarvis
 1816 House occupied and listed in tax records
 1817 Transferred to Sylvester Brown
 1822 Returned to Moses Jarvis, Jr.
 1858 Purchased by Alonzo T. Jerkins
 1862 – 1865 Occupied by Union Army as part of headquarters. Became private residence for General John Foster.
 1868 Purchased by Mary C. Slover

Further reading

National Register of Historic Homes Nomination Form. This is rich in architectural detail, the history of the house and surrounding homes.
The Attic Guest by Robert Knowles referenced in the Historic Register is based on a true story of a minister who stayed in the attic.
The Foscue Plantation cites the Jones–Jarvis House and Eli Smallwood House as inspiration to Simon Foscue for the plantation's design.
Historic American Buildings Survey completed by Thomas T. Waterman 1940, includes a photo of a cover page and the survey showing the address as 99 East Front Street
Library of Congress Prints and Photographs Division "1920's General View of Front and Side" photograph of Jones–Jarvis House.
U.S. Military Institute "Crow nest signal station, Jones–Jarvis house. Southeast corner of East Front and Johnson streets, ca. 1863." photograph showing the signal station built atop the catwalk between the two chimneys. According to A New Bern Album: Old Photographs of New Bern, North Carolina and the Surrounding Countryside by John B. Green III, Union troops used flares, lanterns and flags to communicate with the fort and troops on the other side of the Neuse River.

Related names

Jarvis–Slover House, Jones–Jarvis–Hand House, Jones–Jarvis House, General Foster's Headquarters, Tryon Palace

References

External links

Historic American Buildings Survey in North Carolina
Houses on the National Register of Historic Places in North Carolina
Federal architecture in North Carolina
Houses completed in 1810
Houses in New Bern, North Carolina
National Register of Historic Places in Craven County, North Carolina